Deep Cross Gaming (DCG) is a Taiwanese professional League of Legends team competing in the Pacific Championship Series (PCS), the top-level league for the game in Taiwan, Hong Kong, Macau, and Southeast Asia. It is sponsored by the computer peripherals company Logitech.

History

Founding 
Deep Cross Gaming (DCG) was founded on 20 January 2022; it acquired a spot in the Pacific Championship Series a week later on 27 January. The team's inaugural roster consisted of three former J Team playersjungler Chen "Hana" Chih-hao, mid laner Hsu "Nestea" Bao-yuan, and support Lin "Woody" Hung-yuas well as top laner Chang "Leaky" Tsu-chia, who had then most recently played for ahq eSports Club, and rookie bot laner Chang "Cryscata" Che-lin.

2022 season 

DCG finished fourth in the spring regular season after losing to fellow newcomers CTBC Flying Oyster in a tiebreaker match, qualifying DCG for the first round of playoffs in the winners' bracket. After defeating fifth-place Beyond Gaming in the first round, DCG were swept by defending champions PSG Talon in the second round and knocked down to the second round of the losers' bracket. Despite a convincing sweep of another newcomer team Frank Esports, DCG's playoff run ended in the third round of the losers' bracket, where they were defeated by J Team.

Current roster

References

External links 
 

Esports teams based in Taiwan
Pacific Championship Series teams